Magnolia Award may refer to:

Shanghai Magnolia Award presented by the Shanghai government to foreigners
Magnolia Television Award, presented during the Shanghai Television Festival
Magnolia Award for Best Actress in a Television Series
Magnolia Award for Best Actor in a Television Series
Magnolia Award for Best Television Series
Magnolia Award for Best Television Film or Miniseries
Magnolia Stage Award or Shanghai Magnolia Stage Performance Award